The 1914 William & Mary Orange and Black football team represented the College of William & Mary as a member of the Eastern Virginia Intercollegiate Athletic Association (EVIAA) during the 1914 college football season. Led by second-year head coach Dexter W. Draper, William & Mary finished the season with an overall record of 1–7 and a mark of 1–5 in conference play, placing last out of four teams in the EVIAA.

Schedule

References

William and Mary
William & Mary Tribe football seasons
William and Mary Orange and Black football